"Nashe Si Chadh Gayi" is an Indian dance song sung by Arijit Singh with the French vocals provided by Caralisa Monteiro. The music is composed by Vishal–Shekhar and the lyrics are penned by Jaideep Sahni and the french lyrics penned by Caralisa Monteiro. It is one of the songs from the soundtrack of the film Befikre, dance choreographed by Vaibhavi Merchant, and performed by Ranveer Singh and Vaani Kapoor, leading cast of the film.

Critical reception

The tune of the song is "directly lifted" from the title track of the Japanese animated series, Junjo Romantica, claimed DNA's web team in one of their news. To which Vishal Dadlani, one of the music composers of the song replied that "it is just an 'uncanny coincidence'".

The song's music video has garnered more than 515 million views on YouTube.

Accolades

References

2016 songs
Songs written for films
Hindi film songs
Songs with lyrics by Jaideep Sahni
Songs with music by Vishal–Shekhar
Arijit Singh songs